Night-Glo is an album by American composer, bandleader and keyboardist Carla Bley with bassist Steve Swallow recorded and released on the Watt/ECM label in 1985.

Reception
The Allmusic review by Richard S. Ginell awarded the album 2½ stars and stated "a relaxed, easygoing, easy-listening series of compositions that nearly spills over into fuzak... Bley permits the lazy pina-colada mood to amble undisturbed from track to track".  The Penguin Guide to Jazz awarded the album 2½ stars.

Track listing
All compositions by Carla Bley.
 "Pretend You're in Love" - 4:30  
 "Night-Glo" - 6:45  
 "Rut" - 7:37  
 "Crazy With You" - 5:13  
 "Wildlife: Horns/Paws Without Claws/Sex With Birds" - 12:33

Personnel
Carla Bley - organ, synthesizer
Steve Swallow - bass guitar  
Randy Brecker - trumpet, flugelhorn  
Paul McCandless - oboe, english horn, bass clarinet, soprano saxophone, tenor saxophone, baritone saxophone
John Clark - french horn
Tom Malone - trombone
David Taylor - bass trombone
Larry Willis - piano, electric piano 
Hiram Bullock - guitar
Victor Lewis - drums
Manolo Badrena - percussion

References

ECM Records albums
Carla Bley albums
1985 albums